United States Space Command (USSPACECOM or SPACECOM) is a unified combatant command of the United States Department of Defense, responsible for military operations in outer space, specifically all operations 100 kilometers (62 miles) and greater above mean sea level. U.S. Space Command is responsible for the operational employment of space forces that are provided by the uniformed services of the Department of Defense.

Space Command was originally created in September 1985 to provide joint command and control for all military forces in outer space and coordinate with the other combatant commands. SPACECOM was disestablished in 2002, and its responsibilities and forces were merged into United States Strategic Command. A second incarnation of Space Command was established on 29 August 2019, with a reemphasized focus on space as a warfighting domain.

Mission
Space Command's mission is: "To conduct operations in, from, and through space to deter conflict, and if necessary, defeat aggression, deliver space combat power for the Joint/Combined force, and defend U.S. vital interests with allies and partners."

Organization
United States Space Command has two subordinate components. The Combined Force Space Component Command (CFSCC) is responsible for planning and conducting global space operations, while also providing space effects to the other combatant commands and U.S. allied partners. Joint Task Force–Space Defense (JTF-SD) is responsible for conducting space superiority operations.

On 16 November 2022 Combined Force Space Component Command and Joint Task Force–Space Defense will now report to the Combined Joint Task Force–Space Operations (CJTF-SO), a three-star subcommand of Space Command (the combatant command).  JTF-SD continues to coordinate with the Intelligence Community through the National Space Defense Center. CFSCC continues to support the GPS operations and communications. CJTF-SO coordinates Space Command's Unified Command Plan.

 Combined Joint Task Force–Space Operations (CJTF–SO), Peterson Space Force Base, Colorado
 Combined Force Space Component Command (CFSCC), Vandenberg Space Force Base, California
 Combined Space Operations Center (CSpOC), Vandenberg Space Force Base, California
 Missile Warning Center (MWC), Cheyenne Mountain Space Force Station, Colorado
 Joint Overhead Persistent Infrared Center (JOPC), Buckley Space Force Base, Colorado
 Joint Navigation Warfare Center (JNWC), Kirtland Air Force Base, New Mexico
 Joint Task Force–Space Defense (JTF–SD), Schriever Space Force Base, Colorado
 National Space Defense Center (NSDC), Schriever Space Force Base, Colorado

Service components
As a unified combatant command, Space Command has a number of service components that provide forces to it.

 Space and Missile Defense Command (land component)
 Marine Corps Forces Space Command (United States Marine Corps component)
 Navy Space Command (maritime component)
 First Air Force (air component)
 Space Operations Command (space component)
 Joint Force Headquarters-Cyber Air Force (cyber component)

Relationship with the United States Space Force
United States Space Command is the unified combatant command for all military space operations, while the United States Space Force is the military service responsible for organizing, training, and equipping the majority of forces for U.S. Space Command. Space Command's Space Force service component is Space Operations Command, providing the majority of space forces. U.S. Space Command also consists of smaller amounts of forces from the United States Army, United States Marine Corps, United States Navy, and United States Air Force. This mirrors the relationship between the Space Force's predecessor, Air Force Space Command, and U.S. Space Command (and between 2002 and 2019, United States Strategic Command).

History

First establishment: 1985–2002

United States Space Command was established as a functional combatant command in 1985 to provide joint command and control of the Air Force, Army, and Navy's space forces, as well as prepare for the implementation of the Strategic Defense Initiative.

In the aftermath of the September 11 attacks, the armed forces' focus on homeland defense and counter-terrorism was significantly increased, which resulted in space being deemphasized. It was in this context that the unified command plan was reevaluated, resulting in U.S. Northern Command being established for the defense of the North American continent, while U.S. Space Command was merged with U.S. Strategic Command, where its responsibilities were absorbed into the Joint Functional Component Command for Space and Global Strike. In 2006, this would be replaced by the Joint Functional Component Command for Space, and in 2017, be reorganized as the Joint Force Space Component Commander.

The Army components for the first formation of Space Command were the Army Space Agency (1986–1988); Army Space Command (1988–1992); and Army Space and Strategic Defense Command (1992–1997), which eventually became today's Army Space and Missile Defense Command. Up until 2002 Naval Space Command was the naval component, and Air Force Space Command the USAF component.

Second establishment: 2019–present

The 2019 National Defense Authorization Act, which was signed into law in 2018, directed the re-establishment of U.S. Space Command as a sub-unified combatant command under U.S. Strategic Command; however, in December 2018, the Trump administration directed that U.S. Space Command instead be a newly established, full unified combatant command, with full responsibilities for space warfighting, which at the time, was under the authority of U.S. Strategic Command.

On March 26, 2019, U.S. Air Force General John Raymond was nominated to be the commander of the second establishment of USSPACECOM, pending Senate approval. In 2019 the Department of the Air Force released the list of finalists for the Headquarters of Space Command: Cheyenne Mountain Air Force Station, Schriever Air Force Base, Peterson Air Force Base, Buckley Air Force Base, Vandenberg Air Force Base, and Redstone Arsenal. U.S. Space Command was officially reestablished on August 29, 2019, during a ceremony at the White House. The former Joint Force Space Component Commander was dissolved and folded into Space Command. Following the creation of the United States Space Force in December 2019, the Department of the Air Force widened its search for a location of Space Command's permanent headquarters.

USSPACECOM has two subordinate commands: Combined Force Space Component Command (CFSCC), and Joint Task Force Space Defense (JTF-SD). CFSCC plans, integrates, conducts, and assesses global space operations in order to deliver combat relevant space capabilities to Combatant Commanders, Coalition partners, the Joint Force, and the Nation. JTF-SD conducts, in unified action with mission partners, space superiority operations to deter aggression, defend U.S. and allied interests, and defeat adversaries throughout the continuum of conflict.

In August 2020, In the meeting of the National Space Council, acting Director of National Intelligence announced ''in case of an attack on the U.S. satellites the operational control of intelligence community assets will be in the ambit of the military'', resulting in the National Reconnaissance Office being operationally subordinated to the commander of U.S. Space Command in matters of space defense.

In January 2021, it was announced that Redstone Arsenal in Huntsville, Alabama was the preferred final location for U.S. Space Command. The other locations in contention were Kirtland Air Force Base, Offutt Air Force Base, Joint Base San Antonio, its interim location at Peterson Air Force Base, and Patrick Space Force Base. Despite Peterson Air Force Base in Colorado, being both the original and interim location of Space Command headquarters, Redstone Arsenal was selected, reportedly due to political pressure directly from then-president Donald Trump. A formal review from the DoD IG was initiated to ensure the process that selected Huntsville as the preferred location was impartial and factually sound. Current Secretary of Defense Lloyd Austin came out with his public support and backed the Department of the Air Force's decision process which resulted in the selection of Redstone Arsenal. In May 2022, the review found that the selection of Redstone Arsenal as the permanent site was reasonable and justified.

On 24 August 2021, two years after its establishment, U.S. Space Command announced that it had reached initial operating capability. Achieving full operating capability, according to Lieutenant General John E. Shaw, deputy commander of U.S. Space Command, is dependent on the selection of the combatant command's permanent headquarters.

U.S. Space Command is planning to reorganize its subordinate commands, possibly reactivating the Joint Force Space Component Command (JFSCC), the precursor organization of the combatant command. JFSSC is planned to be the combatant command's "primary warfighting command," formed by combining CFSCC and JTF–SD. Space Force Lieutenant General Stephen Whiting, commander of SpOC, is planned to lead the new organization.

One of the stated objectives of the US Space Command is to ensure, through Space domain awareness (SDA), the survivability of US satellites orbiting in space and to provide lethal force, if necessary, to counter the malign space capabilities of an adversary.

Commanders

Note: The numeric order of the commanders were reset due to the second establishment being considered a different command than the first.

See also
French Space Command
United Kingdom Space Command

References

Citations

Sources 

 

Space Command
Military units and formations disestablished in 2002
Military units and formations established in 1985
Military units and formations established in 2019
Military units and formations in Colorado
Organizations based in Colorado Springs, Colorado
Space units and formations of the United States
1985 establishments in the United States
Space units and formations